Riemerella columbina is a Gram-negative bacterium from the genus of Riemerella which can cause respiratory disease in pigeons.

R. columbina is naturally competent to undergo genetic transformation during growth, especially during the logarithmic phase.  R. columbina preferentially takes up its own genomic DNA rather than heterologous DNA.

References

Flavobacteria
Bacteria described in 1999